Johannes Loop (also John Loop) was an Estonian film director.

Filmography
 1929 "Jüri Rumm" (feature film; director)
 1929 "Vigased pruudid" (feature film; director)
 1924 "Mineviku varjud" (feature film; assisting director)

References

Estonian film directors
Year of birth missing
Place of birth missing
Year of death missing
Place of death missing